Mertlene Perkins (1917–2015) was an American artist. She is associated with the Gee's Bend quilting collective. Her work has been exhibited at the Museum of Fine Arts, Houston and is included in the collection of the Metropolitan Museum of Art.

Early life 
Perkins' mother and father were Maggie Tripp and Isom Martin, respectively. Her mother was a farmer and her father worked on the railroad. She loved being with her mother, so she began to help on the farm the earliest that she could, around eight years old. They mostly raised cotton, corn peanuts, and potatoes.

She attended school for nine years in Prairie, Alabama She married Herman Perkins when she was nineteen. They raised twelve children together, nine of which survived to adulthood.

Work 
Perkins learned to quilt from her mother and grandmother. Quilting was a source of enjoyment for Perkins. Following the tradition of Gee's Bend improvisation style, she remarks that "I just make up my own quilts. I really don't follow nobody's ideas but mine."

References 

Quilters
1917 births
2015 deaths
African-American women artists
20th-century American women artists
20th-century African-American women
20th-century African-American people
20th-century African-American artists
21st-century African-American people
21st-century African-American women